The 2008 Arab Futsal Championship hosted by the Egyptian city of Port Said was the fourth edition of the Arab Futsal Championship between December 23 and 29 2008.
Ten teams took part, with Yemen making their futsal debut, and Syria making their competitive futsal debut after having previously played only 2 friendly matches. And Libya successfully defended their title from 2007 Championship.

Qualification 
The following nine teams qualified for the final tournament. Palestine withdrew.

Withdrew

Venues

Squads

Group stage

Group 1

Group 2

Knockout stage

Semi-finals

Third place play-off

Final

Honors 

Best Player: Rabie El-Hoti - 
Best Goalkeeper: Mohammed Al-Sharif - 
Top Goal Scorer: Khaled Takaji (13) -

External links
Futsal Planet

2008
2008
2008 in futsal
Arab
2008 in African football
Sport in Port Said